Duhaldea is a genus of Asian flowering plants in the daisy family.

 Species
 Duhaldea cappa 
 Duhaldea cuspidata 
 Duhaldea eupatorioides 
 Duhaldea forrestii 
 Duhaldea griffithii 
 Duhaldea latifolia 
 Duhaldea nervosa 
 Duhaldea pterocaula 
 Duhaldea revoluta 
 Duhaldea rubricaulis 
 Duhaldea simonsii 
 Duhaldea wissmanniana

References

Asteraceae genera
Inuleae